Swanwick is a civil parish in the Amber Valley district of Derbyshire, England.  The parish contains eight listed buildings that are recorded in the National Heritage List for England.  All the listed buildings are designated at Grade II, the lowest of the three grades, which is applied to "buildings of national importance and special interest".  The parish contains the village of Swanwick and the surrounding area.  The listed buildings consist of houses, farmhouses and farm buildings, a house expanded into a school and its coach house, and a church.


Buildings

References

Citations

Sources

 

Lists of listed buildings in Derbyshire